"Be Together" is a song from Japanese band TM Network, written by Mitsuko Komuro and composed by Tetsuya Komuro, it was included in their fifth album Humansystem. Despite the fact that it wasn't released as a single and was not popular at its initial release, the 1999 cover made by Ami Suzuki the song became very popular in Japan, and it has since been covered by several artists.

Scandinavian artist Ni-Ni created a cover of "Be Together", which was included in the video game Dance Dance Revolution 5th Mix, and is also featured on her album Mermaid among her most popular songs. Another version exists by the band Attention Deficit, featuring rapper MC Chris. In 2010 it was also covered by voice actor and singer Minori Chihara for the anime series Occult Academy.

Ami Suzuki version

"Be Together" was released as the seventh single by J-pop singer Ami Suzuki, on July 14, 1999. It was produced by Tetsuya Komuro (formerly of TM Network, who had originally released the song). The song was used in TV commercials of Mos Burger, and it became one of the most popular songs of 1999 in Japan.

Information
This is Suzuki's first cover recording, curiously of her mentor Tetsuya Komuro's group of the 80's TM Network. The single was released in two formats: maxi single and vinyl. The maxi included original and instrumental version the song, a live-like version, and also a b-side titled "Night Sky". It became her first number one single on the Oricon charts and became the 17th best selling single of 1999.

Following her blacklisting from the music industry in September 2000, production and distribution of the single stopped in its entirety.

In 2008 the song was re-arranged by Yasutaka Nakata, and since then when Suzuki performs live this version is used, though it hasn't been officially released.

Track listing

Personnel
 Ami Suzuki – vocals

Production
 Producer – Tetsuya Komuro

Charts
Oricon Sales Chart (Japan)

1999 singles
1999 songs
Ami Suzuki songs
Oricon Weekly number-one singles
Songs written by Tetsuya Komuro
Sony Music Entertainment Japan singles